Sara Barattin (born 11 September 1986 in Treviso) is an Italian rugby union player who plays as scrum-half for ASD Villorba Rugby and the Italy women's national rugby union team, where she was the captain from 2016 to 2018. During the 2019 Six Nations championship Barattin became Italy's most capped player (89) overtaking Michela Tondinelli, retired at 87.

Sporting career
Barattin was born on 11 September 1986. Barattin began playing for the Italy women's national rugby union team at the age of 18. Prior to the start of the 2016 season, she was made the team's captain.

Barattin was captain of Italy as they competed in the 2017 Women's Rugby World Cup, the first World Cup for the national side since 2002. She continued to be selected for the following year's Women's Six Nations Championship as the team's captain, by which time she was the most experienced player selected with 77 caps at the start of the tournament.

In 2022, Barattin was selected in Italy's squad for the 2021 Rugby World Cup in New Zealand.

References

Living people
1986 births
Italian female rugby union players
Universiade medalists in rugby sevens
Universiade silver medalists for Italy
Medalists at the 2013 Summer Universiade
Italy international women's rugby sevens players